This is a list of newspapers in Massachusetts, including print and online.

Daily newspapers
This is a list of daily newspapers currently published in Massachusetts. For weekly newspapers, see List of newspapers in Massachusetts.

Non-daily newspapers

College newspapers

 The Amherst Student – Amherst College
 The Beacon – Massachusetts College of Liberal Arts
 The Beacon – Merrimack College
 The Berkeley Beacon – Emerson College
 The Comment – Bridgewater State University
 The Connector – UMass Lowell
 The Daily Collegian – UMass Amherst
 The Daily Free Press – Boston University
 The Harvard Crimson – Harvard University
 The Heights – Boston College
 The Hub – Emmanuel College
 The Independent – Harvard University
 The Justice – Brandeis University
 The Massachusetts Daily Collegian – University of Massachusetts Amherst
 The Mass Media – University of Massachusetts Boston
 The Mount Holyoke News – Mount Holyoke College
The Huntington News – Northeastern University
 The Observer – Bristol Community College
 The Pennon – North Shore Community College
 The Sophian – Smith College
 The Suffolk Journal – Suffolk University
 The Tech – Massachusetts Institute of Technology
 The Torch – UMass Dartmouth
 The Towers – Worcester Polytechnic Institute
 The Tufts Daily – Tufts University
 The Vanguard – Bentley College
 The Wheaton Wire – Wheaton Colletge
 The Williams Record – Williams College
 Le Provocateur – Assumption College

Special-interest newspapers
 The Anchor – Fall River
 Banker & Tradesman – Boston
 Bay Windows – Boston
 Boston Business Journal – Boston
 Fifty Plus Advocate – Worcester
 Massachusetts Lawyers Weekly – Boston
 The Pilot – Braintree
 Sampan – Boston
 The Rainbow Times – Boston

 Monthly Newspapers 

 The Boston Broadside.
 The Boston Irish Reporter.

Foreign-language newspapers

Defunct newspapers

The North Adams Transcript

See also

 Media in Boston, Massachusetts
 List of radio stations in Massachusetts
 List of television stations in Massachusetts
 List of assets owned by Gannett Co., Inc.: Massachusetts 

References

External links

 
 . (Dynamic collection of online news sources about Massachusetts, circa 2008-present)
 
 
 . (Survey of local news existence and ownership in 21st century)

Mass media in Barnstable County, Massachusetts
Mass media in Berkshire County, Massachusetts
Mass media in Bristol County, Massachusetts
Mass media in Essex County, Massachusetts
Mass media in Franklin County, Massachusetts
Mass media in Hampden County, Massachusetts
Mass media in Hampshire County, Massachusetts
Mass media in Middlesex County, Massachusetts
Mass media in Norfolk County, Massachusetts
Mass media in Plymouth County, Massachusetts
Mass media in Suffolk County, Massachusetts
Mass media in Worcester County, Massachusetts
Non-English-language newspapers published in Massachusetts
Newspapers